China Grove may refer to:

Towns and cities
 China Grove, North Carolina
 China Grove, Texas, a suburb of San Antonio
 China Grove, Brazoria County, Texas, an unincorporated community

Historic sites
 China Grove (Gardner, Louisiana), listed on the NRHP in Louisiana
 China Grove (Lorman, Mississippi), listed on the NRHP in Mississippi
 China Grove Plantation, Natchez, Mississippi, listed on the NRHP in Mississippi
 China Grove (Oriental, North Carolina), listed on the NRHP in North Carolina
 China Grove (Georgetown County, South Carolina), formerly listed on the NRHP in South Carolina

Other
 "China Grove" (song), a song on The Doobie Brothers' 1973 album The Captain and Me